Richard Shaw (by 1533-63 or later), of Langton Matravers, Dorset, was an English politician.

He was a Member (MP) of the Parliament of England for Poole in April 1554, Melcombe Regis in 1558 and 1559 and for Wareham in 1563.

References

Year of birth missing
Year of death missing
English MPs 1554
English MPs 1558
English MPs 1559
English MPs 1563–1567